The Dar es Salaam Jazz Band (also nicknamed Dar Jazz) was a Tanzanian big band from Dar es Salaam that was one of the prominent muziki wa dansi bands between the 1960s and 1970s. It was led by Michael Enoch, who would later play in many other major dansi bands. Although Enoch did originally play guitar in the band's first years, he would later be known mostly as a saxophone and trumpet player.

Tanzanian musical groups
Culture in Dar es Salaam